Dmitri Ovchinnikov (born August 19, 2002) is a Russian professional ice hockey forward currently playing with Sibir Novosibirsk of the Kontinental Hockey League (KHL) on loan as a prospect under contract to the Toronto Maple Leafs of the National Hockey League (NHL). He was drafted 137th overall by the Maple Leafs in the 2020 NHL Entry Draft.

Playing career
Ovchinnikov played as a youth with Sibir Novosibirsk of the Kontinental Hockey League (KHL). He made his debut with the senior team during the 2019-20 season.

On February 18, 2022, Ovchinnikov signed a three-year entry level contract with the Toronto Maple Leafs of the National Hockey League (NHL) and was immediately assigned to the Toronto Marlies.

In advance of the 2022–23 season, Ovchinnikov was returned to continue his development with Sibir Novosibirsk on loan from the Maple Leafs on 19 August 2022. Appearing in all 68 regular season games with Sibir, he established new offensive highs with 5 goals and 13 points.

Career statistics

References

External links
 

2002 births
Living people
HC Sibir Novosibirsk players
Toronto Maple Leafs draft picks
Toronto Marlies players
People from Chita, Zabaykalsky Krai
Sportspeople from Zabaykalsky Krai